The canton of Montluçon-3 is an administrative division of the Allier department, in central France. It was created at the French canton reorganisation which came into effect in March 2015. Its seat is in Montluçon.

It consists of the following communes: 
 
Arpheuilles-Saint-Priest 
La Celle
Durdat-Larequille
Marcillat-en-Combraille
Mazirat
Montluçon (partly)
Néris-les-Bains
La Petite-Marche
Ronnet
Sainte-Thérence
Saint-Fargeol
Saint-Genest
Saint-Marcel-en-Marcillat
Terjat
Villebret

References

Cantons of Allier